Gohar Khayyam Mamajiwala (19 November 1910 – 28 September 1985), also known as Miss Gohar, was an Indian singer, actress, producer and studio owner.

Early life
She was born into a Dawoodi Bohra family. Gohar's father's business almost collapsed and the family funds were seriously depleting when a family friend, Homi Master, working at the time as a director for Kohinoor Films, suggested that Gohar take up acting as a career. Her parents agreed.

Career
Gohar started her career at the age of sixteen with the film Baap Kamai/Fortune and the Fools (1926), directed by Kanjibhai Rathod. The role of the hero was portrayed by Khalil and the film was produced by "Kohinoor Films". The film was a hit. Gohar, along with Jagdish Pasta, Chandulal Shah, Raja Sandow and cameraman Pandurang Naik started  "Shree Sound Studios". In 1929, along with Chandulal Shah, she founded  Ranjit Studios, which was later known as Ranjit Movietone.

Later life and death 

She retired in the 1970s and died in Bombay, Maharashtra on 28 September 1985.

Filmography
Fortune And Fools (1925)
Ghar Jamai (1925)
Lanka Ni Laadi (1925)
Briefless Barrister (1926)
Lakho Vanjaro (1926)
Mena Kumari (1926)
Mumtaz Mahal (1926)
Prithvi Putra (1926)
Ra Kawat (1926)
Samrat Shiladitya (1926)
Sati Jasama (1926)
Shrin Farhad (1926)
Thief Of Delhi (1926)
Typist Girl (1926)
Educated Wife (1927)
Gunsundari (1927)
Sati Madri (1927)
Sumari Of Sind (1927)
Grihalaxmi (1928)
Puran Bhagat (1928)
Vishwamohini (1928)
Beggar Girl (1929)
Chandramukhi (1929)
Gulshan-E-Arab (1929)
Magic Flute (1929)
Pati Patni (1929)
Punjab Mail (1929)
Rajputani (1929)
Shirin Khusru (1929)
My Darling (1930)
Raj Laxmi (1930)
The Conqueror (1930)
Wild Flower (1930)
Devi Devyani (1931)
Radha Rani (1932)
Sati Savitri (1932)
Sheil Bala (1932)
Miss (1933)
Vishwa Mohini (1933)
Gunsundari (1934)
Tara Sundari (1934)
Toofani Taruni (1934)
Barrister's Wife (1935)
Desh Dasi (1935)
Kimiti Ansoo (1935)
Derby Ka Shikar (1936)
Gunehgar (1936)
Prabhu Ka Pyara (1936)
Raj Ramani (1936)
Sipahi Ki Sajni (1936)
Pardesi Pankhi (1937)
Achhut (1940)
Usha Haran (1940)

[Note:- Due to several Gohars working in the Hindi film industry, the possibility of errors in filmography can't be ruled out.]

References

External links
 
 

Indian film actresses
1910 births
1985 deaths
Dawoodi Bohras
Indian Ismailis
Actresses in Hindi cinema
Indian silent film actresses
20th-century Indian actresses